Haloimpatiens lingqiaonensis is a Gram-positive, peritrichous, non-spore-forming and rod-shaped bacterium from the genus of Haloimpatiens which has been isolated from wastewater from a paper mill.

References

Clostridiaceae
Bacteria described in 2016
Bacillota